Maria Matios (born on 19 December 1959) is a Ukrainian poet, novelist and official. She won the "Book of the Year 2004" prize and the Taras Shevchenko National Award.

Biography
She was born in the village of Roztoky in the Bukovina region, and presently resides in Kyiv. She has authored 12 volumes of fiction and poetry, including the novel Sweet Darusia (2003), and the collections of stories titled The Short Life (2001) and Nation (2002).

She has also published Banquet at Maria Matios''', the first cookery book written by a contemporary Ukrainian writer, as well as the controversial Boulevard Novel. Her interests include psychology, ethnography, gardening and flower-growing.

Her prose works have been translated into Russian, Polish, English, Serbian, Belarusian (...Hardly Ever Otherwise).

Her first poems were published when she was fifteen years old. In 1992 she published her first prose writing in Kyiv Magazine.
Maria Matios bases her books on the unique experiences of her family, whose roots in the Carpathian Mountains and the Hutsul community go back as far as 1790. She was the winner of the "Book of the Year 2004" prize and of the Taras Shevchenko National Award in 2005 (for her novel Sweet Darusia'').

Matios was placed at number 2 on the electoral list of UDAR during the 2012 Ukrainian parliamentary election. She was elected to parliament. In the 2014 Ukrainian parliamentary election Matios was re-elected to parliament after being number 7 in the top 10 of the electoral list of Petro Poroshenko Bloc. Matios did not take part in the 2019 Ukrainian parliamentary election.

References

External links

 
 Maria Matios' Polish site
 Poems in Russian translation
 Blog of Maria Matios' Polish translator
 Maria Matios

1959 births
Living people
People from Chernivtsi Oblast
Ukrainian writers
Recipients of the Shevchenko National Prize
Ukrainian Democratic Alliance for Reform politicians
Petro Poroshenko Bloc politicians
Seventh convocation members of the Verkhovna Rada
Eighth convocation members of the Verkhovna Rada
People of the Euromaidan
Ukrainian women writers
21st-century Ukrainian women politicians
Women members of the Verkhovna Rada